Lori Paulo Sandri (29 January 1949 – 3 October 2014) was a Brazilian football manager.

Coaching career
He previously managed Atlético Paranaense, Criciúma, Santa Cruz, Guarani, Al-Shabab, Al-Ettifaq, Internacional, Coritiba, Al Ain, the United Arab Emirates national team, Juventude, Al-Hilal, Botafogo (SP), Goiás, Tokyo Verdy, Vitória, Paraná, América (RN) and Sertãozinho.

Managerial statistics

Death
Lori Sandri died, aged 65, of a brain tumor in October 2014.

References

External links
Player profile at SambaFoot
Lori Sandri diz que afastou 'bondes' do Galo, mas não houve tempo para salvação

1949 births
2014 deaths
Brazilian people of Italian descent
Brazilian footballers
Brazilian football managers
Expatriate football managers in Portugal
Expatriate football managers in Saudi Arabia
Expatriate football managers in the United Arab Emirates
Expatriate football managers in Japan
Campeonato Brasileiro Série A players
Campeonato Brasileiro Série A managers
Campeonato Brasileiro Série B managers
Primeira Liga managers
J1 League managers
Saudi Professional League managers
Sport Club Internacional players
Rio Branco Sport Club players
Club Athletico Paranaense players
Londrina Esporte Clube players
Uberaba Sport Club managers
Associação Chapecoense de Futebol managers
Club Athletico Paranaense managers
Criciúma Esporte Clube managers
Botafogo Futebol Clube (SP) managers
Santa Cruz Futebol Clube managers
Guarani FC managers
Al Shabab FC (Riyadh) managers
Ettifaq FC managers
Sport Club Internacional managers
Coritiba Foot Ball Club managers
Sport Club do Recife managers
Al Ain FC managers
United Arab Emirates national football team managers
Esporte Clube Juventude managers
Al Hilal SFC managers
Goiás Esporte Clube managers
Tokyo Verdy managers
Esporte Clube Vitória managers
Paraná Clube managers
Clube Atlético Mineiro managers
América Futebol Clube (RN) managers
Sertãozinho Futebol Clube managers
C.S. Marítimo managers
Esporte Clube Noroeste managers
Association football midfielders
Associação Atlética Internacional (Limeira) managers